SK Český Brod is a Czech football club from the town of Český Brod. They were founded in 1898. They currently play in group C of the Czech Fourth Division.

History

The SK Český Brod was founded in 1898 by young students named Hyros, Winkler and Lukeš. In 1948 they advanced to the Divize (Division) B and in 1990 they advanced to the Bohemian Football League (third-level league in the country).

SK Český Brod won the Championship of Brod five times – in 1952, 1956, 1962, 1982 and 1991.

Current squad

External links
  

Football clubs in the Czech Republic
Association football clubs established in 1898
Kolín District